Dust Yourself Off is the debut album by  Portland, Oregon-based R&B group Pleasure, released in 1975 and produced by Wayne Henderson of The Crusaders.  It also includes a funked-up cover of Maria Muldaur's hit "Midnight at the Oasis". The song "Bouncy Lady" appeared in the video game Grand Theft Auto V, on The Lowdown 91.1, an in-game soul music radio station.

Track listing
"Dust Yourself Off" - (Donald Hepburn) 3:50
"Reality" - (Malon McClain) 5:00
"My Love" - (Marlon McClain) 4:02
"Midnight at the Oasis" - (David Nichtern) 3:26
"Music is My Life" - (Marlon McClain) 4:10
"Plastic People" - (Marlon McClain) 3:58
"Bouncy Lady" - (Donald Hepburn) 3:55
"What is Slick" - (Dan Brewster) 5:10
"Straight Ahead" - (Marlon McClain) 5:32

Personnel
Marlon "The Magician" McClain - Guitar, Lead Vocals, Backing Vocals
Sherman Davis - Lead Vocals
Bruce Carter - Drums
Nathaniel Phillips - Electric Bass, Backing Vocals
Dan Brewster - Trombone, Backing Vocals
Donald Hepburn - Backing Vocals
Dennis Springer - Tenor Saxophone
Joe Sample - Piano (Acoustic), Electric Piano (Fender Rhodes), Clavinet, Synthesizer (Arp)
Dan Mason - Baritone Saxophone
Bruce Smith - Congas, Bongos, Percussion (Flexitone, P.o. Rhythm Box), Cowbell, Backing Vocals
Dick Burdell, Thara Memory - Trumpet

Charts

Samples
"Bouncy Lady"
"Brand New Funk"" by DJ Jazzy Jeff & the Fresh Prince on their He's the DJ, I'm the Rapper album 
"Reality"
"Church"" by De La Soul on their The Grind Date album

External links
 Pleasure-Dust Yourself Off at Discogs

References

1975 debut albums
Fantasy Records albums
Pleasure (American band) albums
Albums produced by Wayne Henderson (musician)